USS Wadsworth (FFG-9), third ship of the  of guided-missile frigates, was named for Commodore Alexander S. Wadsworth (1790–1851). She was the third US Navy ship named Wadsworth. Commissioned in 1980, she served in the US Navy until 2002.

History
Ordered from Todd Pacific Shipyards, Los Angeles Division, San Pedro, California on 27 February 1976 as part of the FY75 program, Wadsworth, originally classified PF-111, was laid down on 13 July 1977, launched on 29 July 1978, and commissioned on 28 February 1980. Wadsworth was sponsored by Mrs. Patricia P. Roberts, the great-great-great-granddaughter of Commodore Alexander S. Wadsworth. 

Wadsworth portrayed  in the 1990 film The Hunt for Red October along with USS Gary (FFG-51).

The ship's motto was "For One's Country" and originates from the words of Captain Isaac Hull, Commanding Officer of  before her August 1812 battle with HMS Guerriere. Hull said, "Men, now do your duty. Your officers cannot have entire command over you now. Each man must do all in his power for his country."

Wadsworth and her crew received Battle Effectiveness Awards for operations in 1993, 1998 and 2001.

She was formally stricken from the Navy list on 23 July 2002.

References

External links

USS Wadsworth FFG-9 Memorial Site

 

Ships built in Los Angeles
1978 ships
Oliver Hazard Perry-class frigates of the United States Navy
Cold War frigates and destroyer escorts of the United States